Don ( or Daun) is a former comune in Trentino in north Italy. On 1 January 2016 it was merged with the neighboring comune of Amblar to form the new comune of Amblar-Don, of which it is now a frazione.

Geography

Demographic evolution

References

Cities and towns in Trentino-Alto Adige/Südtirol
Nonsberg Group